United Nations Security Council Resolution 989, adopted unanimously on 24 April 1995, after recalling Resolution 955 (1994), the council listed the nominations for judges at the International Criminal Tribunal for Rwanda.

The list of nominations was as follows:

 Lennart Aspegren (Sweden)
 Kevin Haugh (Ireland)
 Laïty Kama (Senegal)
 T. H. Khan (Bangladesh)
 Wamulungwe Mainga (Zambia)
 Yakov A. Ostrovsky (Russia)
 Navanethem Pillay (South Africa)
 Edilbert Razafindralambo (Madagascar)
 William H. Sekule (Tanzania)
 Anne Marie Stoltz (Norway)
 Jiri Toman (Czech Republic/Switzerland)
 Lloyd G. Williams (Jamaica/Saint Kitts and Nevis)

See also
 List of United Nations Security Council Resolutions 901 to 1000 (1994–1995)
 Rwandan Civil War
 Rwandan genocide
 United Nations Observer Mission Uganda–Rwanda

References

External links
 
Text of the Resolution at undocs.org

 0989
1995 in Rwanda
 0989
April 1995 events